HLA-B42 (B42) is an HLA-B serotype. The serotype identifies the HLA-B*4201 and *4202 gene products. HLA-B*4201 is common in Central Africa.   (For terminology help see: HLA-serotype tutorial)

Serotype

Serological typing for B*4201 and B*4202 is relatively efficient.

B*4201 allele frequencies

References

4